Flabellina bertschi is a species of sea slug, an aeolid nudibranch, a marine gastropod mollusc in the family Flabellinidae.

Distribution
This species was described from Baja California.

Description
The description of Flabellina fogata includes a table comparing similar species from Mexico.

References

Flabellinidae
Gastropods described in 1990